Caspe is a municipality in the province of Zaragoza, part of the autonomous community of Aragon (Spain), seat of the comarca Bajo Aragón-Caspe. As of 2018 it had a population of 9,525 inhabitants (INE 2018) and its municipality, of 503.33 km2, is the fourth largest in Aragon.

Caspe obtained the title of city in the 19th century, as a result of the damage suffered in the Carlist Wars, by concession of Queen Isabella II.

Name 
There is a popular belief that the name of Caspe comes from ancient inhabitants of the city, originating from the Caspian Sea; However, this etymology lacks philological rigor despite its wide diffusion. The place name Casp appears documented in Andalusi sources such as Qsp, Qasp or Qasb and has been related to the Arabic word Casba. It is also possible that the name of the city derives from the Indo-European root Cass (holm oak) and the suffix pe (place of or below).

Geography 
Caspe is located at the 41.2 parallel of north latitude and on the Greenwich meridian. It is 104 km southeast of Zaragoza on the banks of the Guadalope river —which no longer carries water in this section, having been diverted upstream when building the Mequinenza reservoir, also called the «Sea of Aragon» —and a few kilometers from the Ebro. It is 152 meters above sea level in one of the most arid areas of Aragon, with an average temperature of 15 °C and 325 mm of annual precipitation.

It is located at the crossroads of two axes: the Ebro — in an east–west direction, partly used by the railway — and, perpendicular to it, the one that, starting from Andorra, passes through Alcañiz and continues to Barbastro and Monzón.

Flora and fauna 
Caspe is home to a great diversity of fauna and flora, due to the landscape combination of the steppe, river, forest and Mediterranean forest.

in terms of birds, it is worth noting a diverse population of birds of prey, such as the golden eagle, griffon vulture, peregrine falcon, common buzzard, goshawk and sparrowhawk throughout the year; European merlin, kite and pale harrier in winter, as well as black kite, Egyptian vulture, European short-toed, alcotan, ash harrier and lesser kestrel in summer. As for nocturnal birds of prey, they live the small owl, owlet, scops owl and owl. Although not as extensive as in the surroundings, Caspe has a population of steppe birds that includes the great bustard, common curlew, both species of bargains, the Ortega and the Iberian, and the críalo. The steppe landscape is made up of the juniper juniper and the black juniper, as well as captains, rosemary, thyme and reed beds.

The riverside forests create a complex habitat that joins the mountain landscapes and rainfed fields. Some waterfowl can be found, such as the mallard duck, gray heron, imperial heron, little bittern, little egret and kingfisher. The riverside forests are mainly made up of black poplars, reeds and reed beds. In the bush and bush landscape some forest species inhabit such as the aforementioned sparrowhawk and goshawk, in addition to countless birds, highlighting the common turtledove and bee-eater in summer, the crossbill, red partridge and the increasingly rare common quail. The Mediterranean and mount forests are mainly made up of Aleppo pine, black juniper and white sable, coscolla, ginesta, romerales and thyme.

As for mammals, the red deer stands out, since the only deer that never became extinct in Aragon lives in the area; also the wild boar, common badger, common fox, marten, genet, otter, weasel, roe deer, common rabbit, Iberian hare and rodents such as voles or field mice, among others. Caspe's diversity of habitats makes possible the presence of a considerable variety of amphibians and reptiles. In the rafts and puddles of the mountain they breed the common toad, the spur toad, the running toad, the spotted toad, the common frog and the viper snake. In addition, the Ocellated Lizard, Bastard Snake, Horseshoe Snake and Ladder Snake are found throughout the territory, as well as the leper turtle in the river. In some areas of the forest the rare snout viper lives.

Also, Caspe has a considerable population of white stork in the convent of Santo Domingo and the Collegiate Church of Santa María la Mayor, with a total of 17 couples (2018).

Prehistory and archeology 
The municipality of Caspe seems to have been one of the last to be populated within Bajo Aragón, either due to environmental problems for the prehistoric habitat or because erosion has destroyed the deposits.

However, in the area of Cauvaca an amygdaloid biface has been discovered that can be ascribed to a generic Achelense or an initial Musterian, whose age is 150,000 - 100,000 years, and that demonstrates, at least, the passage through this area of groups of Neanderthal hunter-gatherers. Likewise, lithic pieces similar to the previous one have been found in Soto de Vinué V.

Within the Rock art, the site of the Plano del Polido stands out. Located in a small open hole in the sandstone rock, it contains a set of Levantine-style cave paintings. The composition brings together several figures, highlighting a magnificent deer in an alert attitude to start the fight with another congener that appears with the low antlers. Between both figures a female doe can be seen, in a lower position, and there is also a fourth figure, quite lost, which is possibly another doe. Various remains of paint on the far right of the composition seem to correspond to the figure of an archer.

The great demographic and cultural emergence of Caspe took place around the 8th century BC with the appearance of innumerable towns and tumular necropolises of Indo-European, Celtic hallstatt from the first Iron Age, which correspond to populations mainly from the Segre basin and the high Ebro basin, especially from Navarra and Álava.

Among the deposits of this final Bronze, it is worth mentioning that of the Cabezos de Sancharancón. This town is located on the road from Caspe to Zaragoceta. On a conical hill with a large number of sandstone blocks that accumulate on the slopes, the quadrangular houses are distributed. The ceramic materials collected on the surface typologically fit with those of the advanced Middle Bronze, although there are also very few remains of vessels that can be attributed to the culture of the Urnfield culture, in addition to flint-carved products.

Another interesting deposit is the Cabezo de Monleón, on the Guadalope river, having identified 52 houses that make up a central street plan. Its population has been estimated at 300 inhabitants and the life of those shepherds, metallurgists and cereal farmers could have been extended between 800 BC and iberization.

The deposit of Loma de los Brunos dates from the Iberian era, located in the vicinity of the Civán dam. It corresponds to the old phase of Iberian settlement (6th to 5th centuries BC). Chronologically later is the town of La Tallada, occupied since the 4th century BC. Until its destruction and abandonment in the 1st century BC. Located on the top of a hill, it is medium in size and consists of rectangular houses, many of them carved out of the rock.

From the 1st century, the Ebro valley was fully Romanized and the sites, identified as Roman villas, of Azud de Civán, Boquera del Regallo I-II, Mas de Rabel, Campo de Ráfales, Picardías, Soto de Baños, El Fondón and Miralpeix date from that time. From this last enclave is the Miralpeix Mausoleum, which was moved to its current location as a result of the construction of the Mequinenza reservoir that led to the flooding of the monument. It was built in the late 2nd or early 3rd century AD. C.9

Likewise, local historiography mentions the remains of the city of Trabia, an indigenous population destroyed by the Romans who came to coin money. Both Trabia and the nearby place of Valdurrios are pre-Roman place names. According to some authors, a medieval town was built on its ruins that did not last. Since the middle of the 12th century, Trabia had owned its carta puebla, which indicates that the place had some importance. It was inhabited at least until 1440, year in which it is still recorded that the figure of Justice existed in the place

History

A legend says that Caspe was founded by Túbal, son of Jafet and grandson of Noah, in the expedition that he carried up the waters of the Ebro to Logroño.

Old age 
It has been maintained that, before the Roman conquest of Hispania, the lands that the municipality currently occupies were inhabited by the sedetanos, an Iberian group from the 3rd century BC. However, recent investigations place the tribe of the Ausetans or Ositans in the Caspe region, whose capital, Osicerda, would be located in the Cabezo Palao de Alcañiz. This city-state and its territory possibly reached the Ebro to the north and the Matarraña river to the east, a border line between Ositans and ilercavones.

Middle Age 
Since the arrival of the Muslims in 713, to the Christian reconquest in the first half of the 12th century, the lands of the Ebro constituted the northernmost mark of Al-Andalus, a sector occupied by the Yemeni contingent. In this territory, the Latin culture predominated over the Hispanic-Roman and Visigoth indigenous population of Christians and Jews; but from the 10th century on, the Arabization and Islamization of the population prevailed, leaving Christians and Jews relegated to a small percentage.

Between June and September 1169, Caspe was integrated into the Crown of Aragon by King Alfonso II. The conquest of the town was carried out under the direction of the Count of Pallars, Arnal de Mir, and his son Ramón, in collaboration with other feudal lords. In the Annals of the Crown of Aragon by Jerónimo Zurita, the following is narrated:At this time, the Moors who were in the region of the Edetanos in the castles and forces they had on the banks of the Algas river were waging a great war ... And Caspe was won, a very important place along the banks of the Ebro And from there the war continued on the banks of Guadalob and the Calanda river.It is estimated that the number of inhabitants of Caspe, at the time of the reconquest, could have been somewhat higher than 1,000 inhabitants, being its population overwhelmingly Islamic. Muslims were allowed to keep their religious practices, although they had a year to leave their own home before moving outside the walls. As for the Jews, although it cannot be specified when they arrived in Caspe, what is certain is that when the troops of Alfonso II entered, there were already Jews in the La Muela neighborhood living with the Muslims.

The town then passed to the Order of the Hospital of Saint John of Jerusalem through the exchange carried out with Alfonso II for other assets of the order. Its castle was used as residence of the bailiwick of the hospital. The population managed to stabilize in the last quarter of the 13th century, after Garcelán de Timor was appointed commander of the Bailiwick of Caspe. The town, which then had about 1,500 inhabitants, expanded from La Muela to the surrounding farmhouse with the castle of the Order at the top and the church of Santa María for the whole of the Christian community.

In 1392, Juan Fernández de Heredia, grand master of the order, bought all the possessions in the town from the Sesé family to found a convent. It elevated the church to the category of Collegiate Church and increased the importance of the Sanjuanista Convent by endowing it with treasures and relics such as the "Lignum Crucis". When he died, his body was brought from Avignon and buried in the convent church, in a tomb that he himself had carved.

In medieval times, Caspe was the largest Aragonese center and one of the largest in Spain in the production of glass. It is known of the existence of thirty glass furnaces in its municipal area. The large amount of saline soils favored the growth of the barilla, which together with the quality and quantity of the sand, were the basic elements for the production of glass. It seems that the Jews were the first involved in this industry, mainly between the 14th and 15th centuries. Much of the glaziers belonged to the most important families in the town.

In the fourteenth century, the black plague ravaged the Kingdom of Aragon; There is evidence that the epidemic was installed in Caspe in 1371, even forcing the transfer of the sessions of the Cortes Generales. According to the Anales de Valimaña, about 300 people died in the town, victims of the deadly disease.

The population was the scene in 1412 of the historic "Compromiso de Caspe", when Martin I of Aragon died without descendants. On April 22 of that year, the deliberations of the delegates began, and on June 28 he was proclaimed King Fernando de Trastamara, called that of Antequera, as Fernando I de Aragón. In front of the door that gives access to the atrium of the Collegiate Church of Santa María la Mayor a platform was erected from which the people were informed of the declaration of right voted by the delegates of the States of the Crown of Aragon in favor of Don Fernando . The following day, Fray Vicente de Ferrer preached at the church, who took a very active part in the sessions of the well-known Commitment.

After the Commitment, Caspe remained for the rest of the 15th century as a thriving town with its neighborhoods of La Muela, San Roque and El Pueyo, an agriculture that took advantage of the irrigation of the Ebro and Guadalope prospering. At that time the town had the visit of Pope Benedict XIII, better known as Pope Luna, who came to settle matters between his own family, the Luna, and the Urrea.

Modern age 
Until 1610, the Christian and Muslim communities continued to populate the town. Although they shared the old irrigated land, each had its own municipal area, as well as its own communal assets. Both were vassals of the Order of Saint John of Jerusalem.

Due to its geographical situation, Caspe has been one of the most affected populations by the different conflicts that have occurred in Spain since the 17th century. In the Catalan uprising (1640-1652), it was victim of incursions and raids by the Franco-Catalan troops, as well as fiscal exactions from the monarchy, both of which made a serious impact on its economic situation. In the War of Succession (1701-1711) it was a follower of the Bourbon cause while its neighbors opted for the Austrian aspirant.

19th century 
During the War of Independence, Caspe was occupied by French troops with little resistance on March 4, 1809. Abandoned soon after, it was definitively occupied from June 1809 to 1813. The most important figure in that period was that of the local lawyer Agustín de Quinto, afrancesado who collaborated in government tasks together with the French. In November 1810, Suchet appointed him as General Commissar of the left bank of the Ebro, making Caspe, thanks to Quinto's residence in the town, the capital of the lower half of Aragon. At the end of the war (June 1813), Colonel Ramón Gayán arrived in Caspe determined to take the city from the French. To lift the siege, which lasted fifteen days, he resorted to the construction of two mines: one, from Calle de San Juan to the cellars of the Convent, and the other from the Revuelta. The explosion of the latter damaged the basement of the Castle - where the French had barricaded themselves - but forced them to flee to Mequinenza.

Later, the town was affected by the Carlist Wars, which had special relevance for the population. This was a consequence of the strategic location of the Caspe region, as well as the confiscation of the Order of Saint John of Jerusalem, which generated the discontent of the peasantry at the expectations created, and the loss of purchasing power of peasants, day laborers and artisans, due to the fall in the price of oil. These factors led to the start of the war a not very large group of Caspolinos escaped to the Carlist faction.14

Caspe was the object of the Carlist incursions, suffering sieges, assaults and ephemeral occupations. In May 1835, during the First Carlist War, General Cabrera managed to seize part of the population; in the few hours that the Carlists occupied it, they took important spoils, looting the houses of the Queen's supporters. The following month, Llagostera took control of the first urban enclosure, burning the city afterwards; a year later he managed to take it again, to abandon it soon after. In November 1836 he returned to seize the town, retaining it in his power for eleven days. And in June 1837, Carlist troops took Caspe but, before retiring, burned the town. According to official reports, 223 houses burned, and the fire could not be quenched until the next day. The economic consequences derived from these events must have been significant, causing that henceforth, when there was news of the Carlists entering, the inhabitants flee to the farms.

Pascual Madoz, in his 1845 Geographic-Statistical-Historical Dictionary of Spain, describes Caspe in the following terms: It is located on the banks of the Guadalope river, near its confluence with the Ebro, on 3 or 4 small hills ... It is formed by 1,500 fairly regular houses, distributed in 70 fairly wide streets, 9 squares and a main square with an almost circular figure in the center of the town ... It also has a small fort supported by what was previously a parish church and the convent of San Juan.Regarding its production, it indicates that:The main of these is that of oil; many cereals are also harvested; the wine harvest has declined somewhat and the same happens with that of silk. There are abundant and exquisite fruits of all kinds and legumes and vegetables; likewise hemp and flax; sheep and goats are raised.In 1861, in the interval between the Second and the Third Carlist War, Caspe obtained the city title. However, the political instability of the revolutionary six-year period led to a new boom for Carlist activities and, with the proclamation of the First Republic (February 11, 1873), the Third Carlist War reached its greatest intensity. The most notable event took place in October of that same year when the Carlist troops from Vallés entered Caspe without encountering any resistance; in fact, 600 caspolinos joined the Carlists, setting fire to the Bailío Castle and the old Convent of San Juan. In February 1874, a new Carlist raid took place, led this time by Marco de Bello, in order to raise funds for the purchase of weapons and to pay for the uniforms worn by his combatants.

Probably, the most relevant economic event for Caspe in the 19th century was the arrival of the railway. In June 1876, the municipality agreed to grant a series of privileges to the company that carried out the layout more quickly. Thus, in September 1891, work began on the municipal area of the city, finally reaching the route on October 13, 1893.

Twentieth century 
In 1926 the Ebro Hydrographic Confederation was created in Caspe, an organization that manages the waters and irrigation of the Ebro hydrographic basin, the most important of the ten that have been created in the peninsular territory.

Already proclaimed the Second Spanish Republic, the draft of the Statute of Autonomy of Aragon of 1936 was drafted in this city, also known as the Statute of Caspe, which was not ratified by the Cortes at the outbreak of the Spanish Civil War. During the first part of the war, Caspe was the seat of the Council of Aragon, a government body created by the anarchists in 1936. This entity continued its functions until it was dissolved by government authorities in the summer of 1937, due to its independence from the Republican government. On August 4, the Minister of National Defense, Indalecio Prieto, issued orders to the Army and the 11th Division, under Enrique Líster was sent to Aragon, officially dissolving the Council of Aragon on August. This dissolution took place through a military intervention that took Caspe by surprise. The CNT Local Federation of Trade Unions was taken by assault, tanks and artillery were concentrated at the exit of the city and some confrontations with casualties took place. Joaquín Ascaso, President of the Council of Aragon, and its anarchist members were arrested on various charges.

With the offensive of Aragon in 1938, the republican chief of staff, General Vicente Rojo, installed his operations center in this city, concentrating there all the International Brigades that he was able to gather. On March 15 the Battle of Caspe began, when three Francoist divisions of the Moroccan Army Corps reached the suburbs of the town. The 1st Division of Navarra undertook the siege of Caspe, being present, in the first phase of the battle, the International Brigades XI, XIII and XV; In a second phase that took place on the right bank of the Guadalope river, XII and XIV intervened. Although the interbrigadistas, especially those of the XV Brigade, deployed a strong defense against the attackers, at dusk on March 17 the town was finally conquered by Franco's troops. The war part of the "national" side recorded the fact with these words: This morning the important city of Caspe has been occupied, also establishing a bridgehead 5 kilometers to the east, despite the stubborn resistance opposed by five international brigades.After the conquest, the town became the headquarters of the Moroccan Army Corps, in charge of the troops of the Ebro river.

Demography 
In the document of 1495 —census of the Kingdom of Aragon ordered by King Fernando the Catholic—, Caspe has 295 households, which is equivalent to an approximate population of 1,600 inhabitants. Among them were 10% of Mudejar Muslims, 5% of Jews and 6% of clerics, including Hospital Order knights.

The 1857 census of Spain, which inaugurated the statistical series, records a population of 10,609 inhabitants in the town, being at that time the third most populous nucleus in the province of Zaragoza, after the capital and Calatayud. Within the 20th century, Caspe reached the maximum population, 9,981 inhabitants, in 1950. Starting in the 1960s, the rural exodus began, which affected all of Aragon, resulting in a decrease in the population.

In 2018 the population of Caspe reached 9,525 inhabitants, similar to the one it had in the middle of the 20th century. On the other hand, in recent years there has been a considerable increase in the immigrant population.

Economy 
The city's economy is based on agriculture and the service sector

The basic crop has been the olive tree; from it, an industrial and exporting activity of oil and olives is developed, being the region  included within the scope of the recently approved designation of origin production label. The existence of a benign microclimate and a good irrigation system - due to the confluence of the Guadalope and the Ebro - lead to numerous plantations of fruit trees, especially cherry trees. Around agricultural production there is an important industry of canned vegetables and pickles.

Likewise, animal farming has a great development, existing in Caspe a municipal slaughterhouse and an agricultural market.

Another fundamental sector in the local industry is textiles, a sector that has a great expansion in Caspe and its region. Likewise, the manufacturing industries, metal processing and various workshops are especially numerous, being located in Caspe the General Warehouse for Spain of the sports firm Adidas. The city has four industrial estates, called "El Castillo", "El Portal", "Cabezo Mancebo" and "Los Arcos".

As for the fair activity, Caspe hosts an event in autumn "Expocaspe", the agricultural, livestock, industrial and commercial fair of Bajo Aragón. Another convention that takes place in the city is "Naupesca", dedicated to hunting, fishing and water sports.

The "Dynamization Plan of the Tourist Product of the Bajo Aragón-Caspe / Baix Aragó-Casp Region" is a recent initiative to turn tourism into an engine for economic development for the area.

Heritage 
Regarding with its history, Caspe has an important historical heritage. Among the oldest remains are the cave paintings in the shelter of the Plano del Pulido, declared a World Heritage Site by Unesco since 1998, as well as several Neolithic sites.

From the Roman period is the Miralpeix Mausoleum, declared a national monument in 1931. It consists of a rectangular cella with side walls that support a barrel vault framed in front with two pilasters with Corinthian columns.

Religious heritage 
The Hermitage of Santa María de Horta - rescued from the Mequinenza reservoir and rebuilt on top of a hill overlooking Caspe - is a Romanesque construction. The temple was erected by people from the town of Miralpeix in a popular Romanesque style between the end of the 12th century or the beginning of the 13th century. It is built in ashlar masonry and has an elongated keyhole-shaped plan, divided into five  sections. Also known as Santa María del Fondón, due to its primitive location, it has an interesting semicircular apse.

The Collegiate Church of Santa María la Mayor del Pilar is by far the most monumental building in Caspe. It is one of the most notable examples of purist Gothic in Aragon, still influenced by the Cistercian style. The temple consists of three naves, the central nave being the widest and tallest, all of it covered by a ribbed vault. It was consecrated by Hadrian VI in 1522 and previously, in 1412, the mass proclaiming the ruling of the Caspe Commitment was held there. Located in the highest area of the urban area, it was part of an acropolis organized by the Order of Saint John, which included the church, the castle, which has already been restored today to commemorate the sixth centenary of the celebration of the Commitment to Caspe, and the convent. In 1936 the altarpieces and the two superb Gothic tombs of the Collegiate Church were destroyed, including that of the great master Juan Fernández de Heredia. Currently, the Vera Cruz de Caspe, one of the most important relics of Christendom, is guarded inside; It is one of the largest fragments of the cross on which Christ died (Lignum Crucis). In 1908 the church atrium was declared a National Monument and in 1931 the whole of the Collegiate Church was declared a National Monument.

Several hermitages are preserved in the streets of Caspe, such as Santa Quiteria (1648), or Montserrat —destroyed during the War of Independence but rebuilt in the 19th century—, Magdalena (1790) and La Balma (1843). In the La Muela neighborhood, the oldest in Caspe, is the Hermitage of San Indalecio, a baroque temple from the 18th century, which consists of a central space with a square plan covered with a hemispherical dome on lunettes illuminated with a lantern.

Another religious complex is made up of the building and church of San Agustín, which were part of what was the Convent of San Agustín de Caspe. Completed the works in 1623, it is an example of ordered and functional architecture that follows the canon of the monastic model of the 17th century. The cloister is the main element of the ensemble.

Located in front of the railway station, is the Convent of Santo Domingo, whose church is completely in ruins. During the War of Independence it was a military hospital, cemetery, prison and fortress. Again it was a war hospital in the Civil War, being definitively abandoned in 1978.

Civil heritage 
Within the civil architecture, the Castle of Commitment stands out, whose origin is due to the knights of the Hospital Order. For years the site was used not only as a castle but also as a convent, along with the neighboring church of Santa María. In the 19th century the castle almost disappeared, because during the War of Independence, the French troops blew up the convent and also, in the Carlist wars, it was involved in various combats, even being burned down. Currently, there is hardly any element of the fortress — a wall with a crenellated top with voussoirs decorated with shields — as well as the basements of the fortress.

Another notable bulwark is the Torre de Salamanca, which stands on a hill on the outskirts of the city. From the viewpoint located at the top, you can see a spectacular panoramic view of Caspe and the Ebro valley. It was built by order of General Salamanca in the last Carlist war - the third one - in 1874, being the most modern castle in Aragon. It houses the Heraldry Museum, which collects the heraldic symbols that were characteristic of the Crown of Aragon.

In the urban center, the Plaza Mayor constitutes an interesting complex. On one side of it remain the primitive arcades, in pointed form, called Arcos de Toril, while on the other side is the Town Hall, with a classicist facade from the 19th century, as well as the Casa Palacio Piazuelo Barberán, the most notable of the city. On the other hand, Barrio Verde street evokes the Sephardic community, since in the past it was the main axis of the Jewish quarter.

In the municipal district of Caspe there are two watchtowers from the Carlist Wars: the Turlán Tower, located in the Herradura area about 6 km from the city, and the Valdemoro Tower, in the Magdalena district. The latter, with a square floor plan and built in masonry, was erected during the Third Carlist War in order to monitor the Ebro pass. Another enclave of great beauty is the Puente de los Masatrigos, located 12 km from the town center. Although the current bridge is from the 18th century, it is supported by an earlier structure that dates back to the 13th-14th centuries.

Natural heritage 
The Mequinenza reservoir or "Mar de Aragón" is an environment of great fauna and landscape richness. It extends from Mequinenza to the vicinity of Sástago, going up the old Ebro riverbed. Various facilities allow the practice of numerous water and land sports, but fishing is the star activity in this ecosystem. Caspe is the European capital of black bass or black bass, and fishermen from Europe and America visit this city annually to participate in national and international competitions. During the first weekend of every October the International Black Bass Fishing Championship is held, the most prestigious of all those held in Europe.

Another specie, the catfish, due to its large size, difficult and tiring fishing, is highly appreciated by the uninitiated. It is interesting to note that both black bass and catfish are newly introduced species. However, carp, crucian carp and alburno are the most abundant fish and the most fish, both spontaneously and in competition. The waters stored by the reservoir are thought to contain more than 50 million fish.

Parties and events 
 Fiesta de San Antón, the weekend closest to January 17. Snacks and dinners around multiple bonfires - called 'tederos' - take place throughout the city.
 Easter, declared a festival of tourist interest in Aragon. Drums, drums and bugles accompany the steps of the processions. On Good Friday the Vera Cruz Procession takes place.
 April 30 and May 1. Celebration of the labor party in the Mas de la Punta area, with night camping and musical performances.
 Commemoration of the Caspe Commitment, the last weekend of June. It should be noted the great participation of all the people in the decoration of the streets as well as in the setting of the party with medieval costumes. It has also been declared a festival of regional tourist interest.
 San Roque festivities, from August 12 to 17. On the 16th, the patron saint's feast, there is an offering of fruits as well as a procession to the Hermitage of San Roque. Dances, heifers, competitions and sports activities complete the festive program.
 Regional fair «Expocaspe», from October 29 to November 1. It is an agricultural, livestock, industrial and commercial fair in Bajo Aragón.

Sports 
In football, the city is represented by the C.D. Caspe. Founded in 1923, its best historical classification was the third place obtained in the Third Division in the 1989/90 season. It disputes its parties like the premises in the field of the Rosales, located in the low part of the city.
Indoor football has also a great history and reputation in town.

Gastronomy 
The fertile gardens of the municipality produce a series of products that distinguish the gastronomy of Caspe. These include virgin olive oil, olives in all their varieties — vines, roasts, squash or pâté—, fried dried tomatoes — a local specialty — and cherries. Special mention deserves the unique turmas (Helianthus tuberosus), defined as «tubers similar to potatoes, but smaller and somewhat harder», as well as walnut wine.

As for confectionery, we must mention the almojábanas, the puff pastries, the muffins, the shortbreads of spoon or butter and the renowned Balsa cakes, made with almonds as they were made in medieval times.

Illustrious Caspolinos 
 Indalecio, one of the seven apostolic men and first bishop of Almería.
 Martín García Puyazuelo (1441 - 1521), who, in 1467, translated the Ethics of Catón in redondillas. He had ecclesiastical offices in Rome and was bishop of Barcelona from 1511 until his death.
 Jaime Exerich (? - 1552), disciple of Juan Sobrarias, author of epigrams and philosophical reflections. Professor of Humanities at the University of Zaragoza, he was commissioned by the Diocese of Tarragona at the Council of Trent.
 Agustín de Quinto y Guiu (1774 - 1827). Bachelor of Philosophy, Doctor of Theology and lawyer. War commissioner appointed by the French, he was mayor of Caspe, retaliated as liberal and amnestied. He is the author of various treaties on agriculture and beekeeping.
 Francisco Javier de Quinto y Cortés, I Count of Quinto, (1810 - 1860). Doctor of Law, he was head of Section of the Ministry of the Interior, Corregidor of Madrid, general director of Post, deputy to Cortes, senator of the Kingdom (1859), dean of the Central Commission of Monuments, head of the House of Queen Doña María Cristina de Borbón, honorary minister of the Supreme Council of War and Navy, great cross of the Order of Isabel la Católica (1844), and academic of number of the Royal Spanish Academy as well as of the Royal Academy of Fine Arts of San Fernando.
 José María Albareda, general secretary of the CSIC and rector of the University of Navarra.
 Miguel Agustín Príncipe (1811 - 1863). Writer, professor of Literature and History at the University of Zaragoza, lawyer and librarian of the National of Madrid.
 Eduardo López del Plano (1840 - 1885). Disciple painter of Montañés and the Academia de San Fernando, in whose studies he received different awards.
 Blessed Acisclo Pina Piazuelo, baptized Joaquín, (1878 - 1936). Oblate of the Hospitaller Order of Saint John, he was beatified as a martyr of the faith by John Paul II.
 Manuel Buenacasa Tomeo (1886 - 1964). Spanish carpenter, journalist, writer, trade unionist and anarchist, member of the National Confederation of Labor (CNT).
 José María Albareda (1902 - 1966), professor of agriculture at the Velázquez Institute in Madrid and general secretary of the Higher Council for Scientific Research. Endowed with a great investigative vocation, he founded and directed the Institute of Pedology, where numerous pedologists, researchers and teachers were trained.
 Sebastián Cirac Estopañán (1903 - 1970). Doctor in Classical Philology and History, professor at the Seminary of Cuenca, Archivist Canon of the Cathedral of Cuenca, philologist, linguist, Hellenist, Professor of Greek Philology at the University of Barcelona.
 José Altabella Hernández (1921 - 1995). Professor at the Official School of Journalism, first professor of Journalism History at the Complutense University of Madrid.
 Luis Andrés Edo (1925 - 2009). Union member and Spanish anarchist, member of the National Confederation of Labor (CNT).
 Manuel Pellicer Catalán (1926 - 2018). Archeologist, Professor of Prehistory and Archeology at the University of Seville. He was founder of the Departments of Prehistory and Archeology of the Universities of Granada, La Laguna and Seville.
 Alberto Portera (b. 1928), doctor, neurologist, and expert in painting and art history.
 Eliseo Bayo (n.1939). Journalist, writer, essayist, and international analyst and consultant.
 Francisco Lovaco Castellano (1945 - 2007). Physician, urologist, specialist in renal lamparoscopic surgery, creator of the Endourology Unit of the Ramón y Cajal University Hospital in Madrid, and author of the "F. Lovaco technique" of lamparoscopic surgery.
 Manolo Royo (b. 1951). Stage name of Manuel Royo Ubieto, Spanish actor and humorist.
 Abel Mustieles (b. 1991). Mountain bike trials cyclist, four times world champion, in 2013, 2015, 2016 and 2017, and three times European champion, in 2012, 2013 and 2014.

Twin towns
  Almería, Spain, since 1998
  Gaillac, Francia
 Santa Maria a Vico,  Italia
 Regla,  Cuba

References
Historia de Caspe (Ayuntamiento de Caspe)
Caspe (Gran Enciclopedia Aragonesa)
Caballú Albiac, M.; Cortés Borroy, F.J. (coordinadores). Comarca de Bajo Aragón-Caspe. Gobierno de Aragón.
Cabezo de Monleón. Turismo de Zaragoza
Loma de los Brunos. Iberos en el Bajo Aragón
La Tallada. Iberos en el Bajo Aragón
Mausoleo Romano de Miralpeix. Patrimonio cultural de Aragón (Gobierno de Aragón)
«El islam y los judíos en Caspe. Andrés Álvarez Gracia». Archivado desde el original el 23 de septiembre de 2015. Consultado el 5 de noviembre de 2014.
Notas sobre la Edad Media cristiana en la comarca del Bajo Aragón-Caspe. Esteban Sarasa Sánchez.
«La comarca de Bajo Aragón-Caspe en el siglo XIX. Francisco Javier Cortés Borroy». Archivado desde el original el 19 de octubre de 2016. Consultado el 8 de noviembre de 2019.
Cortés Borroy, Francisco Javier (2008). Bajo Aragón Caspe, ed. La Guerra Carlista (1833-1855) en la Comarca del Bajo Aragón Caspe / Baix Aragó Casp.
Hugh Thomas (1976); Historia de la Guerra Civil Española. Barcelona: Círculo de Lectores; pág. 464
Gaceta de la República: Diario Oficial núm. 223, (11 de agosto de 1937)
11 de agosto de 1937. Se cumplen 80 años de la disolución del Consejo de Aragón.
Hugh Thomas (1976); Historia de la Guerra Civil Española. Barcelona: Círculo de Lectores; pág. 781
&Navarro Espinach, Germán (2009-2010). «Ciudades y villas en el Reino de Aragón el siglo XV. Proyección institucional e ideología burguesa». Anales de la Universidad de Alicante. Historia Medieval. 16. pp. 195–221.
Censo de 1857. Zaragoza (INE)
INE: Población por municipios y sexo.
Ministerio de Hacienda y Administraciones Públicas (Gobierno de España). «Treinta aniversario de las primeras elecciones municipales de la democracia». Archivado desde el original el 6 de marzo de 2014. Consultado el 6 de marzo de 2014.
Alcaldes de Aragón de las elecciones de 2011
«Alcaldes de todos los municipios de la provincia de Zaragoza». Heraldo.es. 14 de junio de 2015.
Gobierno de Aragón. «Archivo Electoral de Aragón». Consultado el 27 de septiembre de 2012.
Ermita de Santa María de Horta. Bienes de interés cultural de Aragón.
Colegiata de Santa María la Mayor.  Bienes de interés cultural de Aragón.
Ermita de San Indalecio. SPICA (Gobierno de Aragón)
Edificio e iglesia de San Agustín. Bienes de interés cultural de Aragón.
Castillo del Compromiso. Bienes de interés cultural de Aragón.
Torre de Valdemoro. SPICA (Gobierno de Aragón)
Mar de Aragón en Caspe. Turismo de Zaragoza.
C.D. Caspe
«Joyas gastronómicas en Caspe». Aragondigital.es. 27 de enero de 2009. Consultado el 18 de noviembre de 2013.
Gastronomía de Caspe (Ayuntamiento de Caspe)
José María Albareda Herrera (Real Academia de Historia)

External links

 Town website

Municipalities in the Province of Zaragoza